GMMTV, acronym for Grammy Television (which was its former name), is a television production and talent agent subsidiary to the Thai entertainment conglomerate GMM Grammy, under The One Enterprise, which produces television shows, songs, and music videos. It was founded on August 3, 1995. Sataporn Panichraksapong is the company's managing director.

History 

GMMTV Company Limited (also known as Grammy Television Company Limited) was founded on August 3, 1995 by the GMM Grammy executives who saw the potential in developing, growing and strengthening the Thai television industry. The marketing department of the company was created into a separate entity to manage the television production industry. GMMTV started to produce TV game shows and music shows for analogue TV stations in Thailand at that time, namely, Channel 3, Channel 5, Channel 7, and iTV, with Duangjai Lorlertwit and Saithip Montrikul na Ayudhaya as the managing directors, respectively.

In 2007, Saithip Montrikul na Ayudhaya left the company to manage GMM Media Public Co., Ltd. As a result, Sataporn Panichraksapong, who was then the deputy managing director, became the new managing director and renamed the company into GMMTV Company Limited.

On February 2, 2009, the company started running a cable and satellite television channel named Bang Channel by moving some of the TV shows which were aired on Channel 5 to its own channel, and began to produce different television programs in other genres aside from game shows and music shows. On June 29, 2011, GMMTV had set up a joint venture with Rungtham Pumseenil to establish Memiti Co., Ltd. to expand and innovate the Thai television industry with 70% of shares held by GMMTV, and 30% held by Rungtham. Consequently, Memiti became a subsidiary of GMMTV.

Due to the business restructuring of GMM Grammy, on June 24, 2015, GMM Grammy's board of directors has passed the resolution to dispose of the total 70% shares held by GMMTV in Memiti to The One Enterprise or One 31 channel business group as a new shareholder affecting Memiti to become a subsidiary of The One Enterprise accordingly. On December 5 the same year, GMMTV's board of directors resolved to close its cable and satellite television channel and instead focus on television production for One31 and GMM 25 which are digital channels. As a result, Bang Channel stopped broadcasting from December 31, 2015, onwards.

On August 24, 2017, after Adelfos Co., Ltd, a subsidiary of TCC Group (Thailand) has subscribed for the newly issued ordinary shares in GMM Channel Trading Co., Ltd.,  GMM Grammy has restructured its business to be in line with the share subscription agreement by passing a resolution to transfer all of its shares held in GMMTV to GMMCH (GMM Channel Holding Co., Ltd., formerly GMM Channel Trading Co., Ltd.) or the business group of GMM 25 as the new shareholder.

However, on November 27, 2020, the board of directors’ meeting of GMM Grammy, in company with Siridamrongdham Co., Ltd. of TCC Group, had the resolution to dispose of and transfer all of their shares in GMMCH to ONEE (The One Enterprise Public Company Limited or One31 business group) in accordance with the conditions and plans in relation to an initial public offering and list ONEE in the Stock Exchange of Thailand. As a result, the company has been a subsidiary of The One Enterprise group with Takonkiet Viravan as the indirect director since December 1.

On November 22, 2022, during the GMMTV 2023 Diversely Yours, press conference, Sataporn announced plans to invest a 51% stake in Parbdee Tawesuk Co., Ltd., the creative production house which co-produced Wake Up Ladies: The Series, The Gifted, F4 Thailand: Boys Over Flowers, etc. in an effort to grow GMMTV's business model and enhance potential and elevate Thai content to reach new heights in the global market. The acquisition was completed a month later on December 22, 2022.

Currently, GMMTV is producing entertainment programs, dramas, and television series under the supervision and management of The One Enterprise which has the right to organize both One31 and GMM 25 channels, and because of its successful production teen/drama series as well as Boys' Love series on GMM 25, The One Enterprise granted the primetime timeslot from 8:30 pm – 9:30 pm of GMM 25 for GMMTV to provide and broadcast their series every week.

Artists

Current 
These are the current artists under the talent arm of GMMTV including TV presenters/hosts, actors and singers:

Former

Television and online

TV shows 
Aside from its dramas and boys' love series airing on primetime every 20:30 ICT slot on GMM25, GMMTV also produced variety shows that air on GMM25. Every show's full episode catch-up is available via GMMTV's YouTube channels as well as other social media platforms and partner streaming services.

 On GMM25
School Bus: School Rangers – Saturday, 12:00 pm (ICT)
Talk-with-ToeyS – Saturday, 10:30 pm (ICT)
Wow! Thailand – Sunday, 12:00 am (ICT)
Toey Tiew Thai – Sunday, 10:30 pm (ICT)

Online shows 
GMMTV is also releasing exclusive online shows through their YouTube channels as well as other social media platforms and partner streaming services.

On GMMTV Official (6:00 pm ICT)
 Once Upon A Time with Tay Tawan – Mondays (since September 12, 2022)
 E.M.S: Earth-Mix Space (Season 2) with Earth and Mix – alternate Tuesdays (starts January 17, 2023)
 Arm Share with Arm Weerayut – Wednesdays (since April 16, 2019)
 Lay's Very Thai Very Toey with Golf, Godji and Jennie – alternate Thursdays (starts February 23, 2023)

On Toey Tiew Thai & Friends (5:00 pm ICT)
 Rot Song Taew with Pompam, Jennie, Pingpong, and Madame Mod – alternate Wednesdays (since July 20, 2022)
 Cheer Reader with Golf and Pompam – alternate Wednesdays (since July 21, 2022)

Defunct

Special shows 
Special show is a documentary program presenting GMMTV's drama and television series, including cast and crew interviews, behind-the-scenes, and footage from the production. It normally airs a week before the first episode or after the last episode on GMM 25 and GMMTV's official YouTube channel.

Discography 
GMMTV has been producing original soundtracks and covers under the label GMMTV Records. The vocalist(s) of a song may be either an artist under GMMTV or any subsidiary of GMM Grammy conglomerate.

On January 20, 2023, GMMTV launched its brand new record label, Riser Music consisting Perawat Sangpotirat (Krist), Vachirawit Chivaaree (Bright), and Korapat Kirdpan (Nanon) as the initial artist roster. It will include members of SIZZY and a boy group from the survival reality show, Project Alpha respectively.

Filmography

Films

Drama 
Most of GMMTV's drama and television series plot and screenplay are based on or adapted from fictions and novels.

Currently, GMMTV-produced series and dramas air from Mondays to Sundays at 8:30-9:30 pm (ICT) through Channel GMM25, while the full uncut version of series' episodes are made available right after airing or delayed telecast through their respective partner streaming services, (Such as AIS Play, Viu, WeTV, Disney+ Hotstar and oneD).

The divided portions of series' episodes will be airing simulcast for international viewers through GMMTV's official YouTube channel. These may be supplemented by English subtitles or captions.

TV series 

 Currently airing
 In post-production or Not yet aired
 In production or Filming
 Upcoming

Cancelled series 
On 23 September 2020, GMMTV issued an official statement on the cancellation of the following series due to the COVID-19 pandemic:

On 22 November 2022, In GMMTV 2023 DIVERSELY YOURS, it was announced that due to schedule conflicts from the COVID-19 pandemic, a series was canceled.

Events

Thailand 
Events held in Thailand are directly organized by GMMTV and/or sponsors, including press conferences, concerts, exhibitions and fan meeting events.

Overseas 
Events held abroad are not directly organized by GMMTV but in cooperation with foreign corporations and organizers, including exhibitions and fan meeting events.

Virtual/Online 
Events held in Thailand are directly organized by GMMTV and are made available to a global audience through the partner service.

Partnerships 
  ABS-CBN
  TV Asahi

References

External links 
 

 
GMM Grammy
Television production companies of Thailand
Mass media companies established in 1995
1995 establishments in Thailand